Takapoto Airport is an airport on Takapoto in French Polynesia . The airport is south of the village of Fakatopatere.

Airlines and destinations

References

External links

Airports in French Polynesia